The streak-throated fulvetta has been split into the following species:
 Grey-hooded fulvetta, Fulvetta cinereiceps
 Manipur fulvetta, Fulvetta manipurensis
 Taiwan fulvetta, Fulvetta formosana

Birds by common name